The Menorah center is a cultural and business center of the Jewish community in Dnipro in Eastern Ukraine. Some sources declare it to be the biggest multifunctional Jewish community center in Europe or in the world. The heart of the complex is the historic Golden Rose central synagogue, built in the 19th century.

The dedication ceremony of the Menorah center took place on October 16, 2012, with guests that include Rabbi Chief Rabbi of Ukraine Yaakov Bleich, Sephardic Chief Rabbi of Israel Shlomo Amar, Israel Minister of Information and Diaspora Yuli-Yoel Edelstein, Rabbi Moshe Kotlarsky, Rabbi Shmuel Rabinovitch, representatives of Jewish institutions (including Hillel, the Jewish Agency, the American Jewish Joint Distribution Committee etc.), Ukrainian state and local authorities, and diplomatic corps.

Idea 
The idea to create Menorah center, as one of the biggest such centers in the world, belongs to the President of the Dnipropetrovsk Jewish community Gennadiy Bogolyubov Europe and the President of the United Jewish Community of Ukraine (also the founder of European Jewish Union) Ihor Kolomoyskyi. They both provided full financial support for the project implementation. The supposed concept of the Menorah center construction is to combine three functional elements (spirituality, culture and business) in one complex building.
The Rebbe of Chabad, Menachem Mendel Schneerson, was born in Nikolayev, Ukraine, but raised in Dnepropetrovsk, then known as Yekatrinoslav, where his father served as chief rabbi until his 1939 arrest by Soviet authorities.

General description 
The center is built in the shape of a seven-branched synagogue candelabrum (menorah). It consists of seven marble towers, the highest of which is 20 stories (77 m.) tall. The construction has total floor area of about 50,000 sq.m. There are a synagogue, museums, office premises, shopping spaces, publishing house, art galleries, kosher restaurants and cafes, conference halls, banquet halls, a luxury hotel, youth hostel, classrooms, tourist information center, visa center of Israel. General project design was made by architect Alexander Sorin.

Signs and labels in Menorah are written in four languages - English, Ukrainian, Russian and Hebrew. The official address of the center is Sholom-Aleikhema St., 4/26, Dnipro, Dnipropetrovsk Oblast, 49000, Ukraine.

One of the center's declared priorities is to use business profits for funding charitable projects. The presumed purpose is to serve Jewish community of about 30,000 in Dnipro and its other population disregarding background.

Opinions about the Menorah center 
 Rabbi Shmuel Kaminetsky — chief Rabbi of Dnipropetrovsk region:

 Chaim Chesler — founder of Limmud in the former Soviet Union:

 Beth Moskowitz — representative of Boston's Jewish Community Relation Council:

Activities 
Business forum “Ukraine is a country of entrepreneurs” for young business people was hosted by the Menora center on November 24, 2016. More than 400 representatives of small and medium-size enterprises took part in that forum.

The Ukrainian Association of Patriots (UKROP Party) held there its conference and a general meeting of supporters from all over Ukraine in November, 2016.

Some Ukrainian Jewish refugees from armed conflict zone in Donetsk and Luhansk regions have used the Menorah center facilities for resettlement and rehabilitation.

Following the 2022 Russian invasion of Ukraine, the Menorah Center has become a center for humanitarian aid to refugees who have fled the various battle zones. It is also said to sheltering its patron, Ihor Kolomoyskyi.

Infrastructure

Synagogue 
 Golden Rose central synagogue.

Museums 
 Museum "Jewish Memory and Holocaust in Ukraine".

It is the largest in the former Soviet Union. It covers 3,000 sq.m. and use up-to-date technologies (multimedia installations, video and audio records broadcasts, hologram images). The museum has the information center, libraries, classrooms.

Research and Education Center 
 Institute for the Study of Holocaust "Tkuma".

Hotels 
 "Menorah Hotel" - 4-star international hotel.

It is the only one in a former part of the Soviet Union, which gives an opportunity to all observing shabbat.
 "7 Days City Hotel" - 16 rooms in minimalistic style.

Conference Halls 
 "Sinai Hall".
 "Menorah Grand Hall".
 "Menorah Ballroom" .
 "Menorah Royal Club".
 "Conference Hall Small".
 "Pchelkine House".
 "Troitskaya Street Conference Hall".

Banquet Halls 
 "Menorah Grand Hall".
 "Menorah Ballroom".
 "Menorah Grand Terrace".
 "Pchelkine House".
 "Menorah Cafe".

Art Gallery 
 Gallery of modern and traditional art.

Image gallery

References

External links 
 Menorah Center Official web-site

Jewish Community Center
Organizations established in 2012
Buildings and structures in Dnipro
2012 establishments in Ukraine
Chabad houses
Chabad in Europe
Hasidic Judaism in Ukraine